Gerda Søvang Fiil (30 January 1927 - 26 June 1994) was a convicted member of the Danish resistance, whose father and brother were executed by the German occupying power.

Biography 

Gerda Søvang Fiil was born in Hvidsten on 30 January 1927 as the fourth of five children to proprietor Marius Fiil and wife Gudrun Fiil and baptized 28 March in Gassum church with her grandfather inn keeper in Hvidsten Niels Pedersen as godfather.

That year she lived in Hvidsten Inn with her 72-year-old grandfather as inn keeper, her parents, brother and three sisters and a farm hand, a maid and a manager.

She was confirmed Palm Sunday in Gassum church in 1941, while living in Hvidsten with her family.

During the later stage of the occupation the family and other locals formed a resistance group, the Hvidsten group.

With the group she helped the British Special Operations Executive parachute weapons and supplies into Denmark for distribution to the resistance.

In March 1944 the Gestapo made an "incredible number of arrests" including in the region of Randers herself, her father the "nationally known folklore collector and keeper of Hvidsten inn Marius Fiil", her brother Niels Fiil, her oldest sister Kirstine and her brother-in-law Peter Sørensen.

The following month De frie Danske reported on her father again, that he along with other arrestees from Hvidsten had been transferred from Randers to Vestre Fængsel.

In June 1944 a court martial sentenced Fiil to two years in a juvenile prison.

On 29 June 1944 her father, brother and brother-in-law and five other members of the Hvidsten group were executed in Ryvangen.

On 15 July 1944 De frie Danske reported on the executions, her two-year prison sentence and the life sentence of her sister Kirstine and compared her father to Svend Gønge and Niels Ebbesen.

Fiil and her sister were imprisoned separately in Germany, but she was soon after pardoned and returned to Denmark.

In April 1945 Fiil was therefore able to join her mother in receiving her older sister in the Danish border town Padborg, to which Kirstine had been evacuated with the White Buses after also receiving a pardon.

On 2 July 1945 the remains of her father and brother were found in Ryvangen and transferred to the Department of Forensic Medicine of the university of Copenhagen. The remains of her brother-in-law and the five other executed members of the group were found in the same area three days later. The following inquests showed that they had been executed with gunshot wounds to the chest.

On 10 July 1945 her executed family members and the five other executed group members were cremated at Bispebjerg Cemetery.

Gerda Fiil died in Hvidsten on 26 June 1994, survived by her husband Svend Jessen. They are both buried in Spentrup cemetery.

Portrayal in the media

References

1927 births
1994 deaths
Danish people of World War II
Danish resistance members